One Thing at a Time is the third studio album by American country music singer Morgan Wallen, released on March 3, 2023, through Big Loud Records. It features 36 tracks, including the singles "You Proof", "Thought You Should Know", "Last Night", the title track and the promotional single "Don't Think Jesus", as well as collaborations with Eric Church, Hardy and Ernest. A sampler containing three tracks from the album—"One Thing at a Time", "Days That End in Why" and "Tennessee Fan"—preceded the album in December 2022. The announcement of the album came alongside the release of three more tracks—"Last Night", "Everything I Love" and "I Wrote the Book".

The album received mixed reviews from critics, and debuted at number one on the US Billboard 200 with 501,000 album-equivalent units, marking the biggest week for a country album by units since 2021. Wallen will embark on the One Night at a Time Tour in support of the album from April 2023.

Background
In a statement released January 30, Wallen explained that the album "brings together the musical influences that have shaped [him] as an artist – country, alternative and hip-hop" and the album ended up with 36 songs "because [they] just kept exploring with fresh lyrics, music and production ideas and these are the songs that felt right" to him. Billboard described the album as "genre-blending".

The cover photograph was taken at Wallen's grandfather's home in Sneedville, Tennessee.

Critical reception

One Thing at a Time received mixed reviews from critics, with a score of 48 out of 100 based on five critics' reviews at review aggregator Metacritic. Nicholas Hautman of Page Six wrote that Wallen "wastes no time acknowledging his flaws" and has "an admirable sense of self-awareness here", finding him to have "evolving maturity" and a "story [that] make[s] for one hell of an album". Paul Attard of Slant Magazine found One Thing at a Time to be "wildly uneven" with "little here that could be considered fresh by Wallen's standards", as "his music is typically concerned with one of three things: getting shitfaced, being lovesick, or Jesus" while still having several "production flourishes" that see Wallen "experimenting, if ever so slightly, with his sound".

Stephen Thomas Erlewine of AllMusic wrote that the album's "untrammeled sprawl [of 36 tracks] means [it] offers a little something for everybody", with "party songs, sad songs, songs that lift liberally from classic rock standards" as well as "songs about beer, songs about whiskey, and songs about wine". Sam Sodomsky of Pitchfork criticized the length, apparent ethos of "Wallen being true to only himself" while having 49 co-writers, and the tracks "covering the same thematic territory", although acknowledging there are occasional "minimalist rhythms" that "accentuate his gift for delivering tugging, bittersweet pop melodies" as well as "couplets clever enough to catch you off guard". Sodomsky felt that the title "seems to acknowledge that Wallen considers this a transitional moment" and concluded that "none of this leads to anything interesting enough to change how you think of Morgan Wallen".

Commercial performance
One Thing at a Time debuted at number one on the US Billboard 200 dated March 18, 2023, with 501,000 album-equivalent units, including 111,500 pure album sales. It is Wallen's second consecutive US number-one album and marks the biggest week of 2023 for album units earned, and overall biggest week for a country album since Red (Taylor's Version) by Taylor Swift in November 2021. Its 36 tracks earned a total of 498.28 million on-demand streams.

In the week of the album's release, all 36 tracks entered the Billboard Hot 100, breaking the record set by Drake for most songs by an artist on the chart at one time, as well as the record for most debuts on the chart, with 27. Wallen also occupied five of the top 10 songs and achieved his first number-one song with "Last Night".

Track listing

Notes
"Everything I Love" features an interpolation from "Midnight Rider" by The Allman Brothers Band
"180 (Lifestyle)" features an interpolation from  "Lifestyle" by Rich Gang

Personnel
Musicians

Morgan Wallen – vocals
Bryan Sutton – acoustic guitar (tracks 1–15, 17–29, 31–34, 36), ukulele (2), mandolin (4, 7, 8, 14, 15, 20, 23, 28–30, 33, 36), banjo (8), Dobro (11), bouzouki (36)
Jimmie Lee Sloas – bass guitar (1, 3–5, 7–15, 17–24, 26–33, 35, 36)
Jerry Roe – drums (1, 3–8, 10–12, 14–24, 26–32, 34–36), percussion (1–7, 9, 11, 15, 17–19, 23–25, 27, 28, 30, 32, 34–36)
Tom Bukovac – electric guitar
Derek Wells – electric guitar (1, 3, 11)
Dave Cohen – keyboards (all tracks), Hammond B3 organ (17, 30, 35)
Zach Abend – programming (1)
Charlie Handsome – programming (2, 16, 25, 31, 34), electric guitar (3, 25)
Wes Hightower – background vocals (3, 14, 15, 28, 33)
Dan Dugmore – steel guitar (4, 10, 14, 20, 36)
Eric Church – vocals (4)
Todd Lombardo – acoustic guitar (5, 16, 27, 30, 35), mandolin (17, 30)
Paul Franklin – steel guitar (5, 7, 17, 30, 32)
Mark Hill – bass guitar (6)
Jacob Durrett – programming (8, 9, 13, 19, 31, 33)
Cameron Montgomery – programming (9)
Hardy – vocals (15)
Ben Stennis – programming (18)
Dominic Frost – electric guitar (23, 29)
Ernest – vocals (33)
James Maddocks – programming (34)
Ashlyne Wallen – background vocals (35)

Technical
Joey Moi – production, mixing
Charlie Handsome – co-production (2, 16, 25, 34)
Jacob Durrett – co-production (9, 13, 19, 31, 33)
Cameron Montgomery – co-production (9)
Ted Jensen – mastering (1–5, 7–22, 24–26, 28–36)
Justin Shturtz – mastering (6, 23, 27)
Josh Ditty – engineering, editing (all tracks); co-mixing (3, 35)
Elvind Mordland – editing (all tracks), co-mixing (1, 26)
Ryan Yount – editing, engineering assistance
Scott Cooke – editing
Steve Cordray – engineering assistance (1, 14, 18, 20, 28)
Joey Stanca – engineering assistance (2, 3, 8–10, 12, 21, 23, 26, 29, 33, 36)
Sean Badum – engineering assistance (4, 5, 7, 13, 15–17, 19, 22, 25, 27, 30, 31, 35)
Lucas Glenney-Tegtmeier – engineering assistance (6, 11)
Ally Gecewicz – production coordination

Charts

References

2023 albums
Albums produced by Joey Moi
Big Loud albums
Morgan Wallen albums